Crossocheilus periyarensis is a species of fish in the family Cyprinidae. This species is only found in Periyar River in Kerala, India.

References

Cyprinid fish of Asia
Freshwater fish of India
Fish described in 1996
Crossocheilus